The electoral district of Gippsland East is an electoral district of the Victorian Legislative Assembly. It covers most of eastern Victoria and includes the towns of Bairnsdale, Lakes Entrance, Orbost, Omeo, Maffra and Heyfield. Gippsland East is the state's third largest electorate in area and covers 27,544 square kilometres.

The National Party held the seat without interruption from 1920 to 1999. However at the 1999 election independent candidate Craig Ingram unexpectedly won the seat after receiving preferences from the independent, One Nation and Labor candidates.

Ingram's victory affected state politics—Ingram and fellow Independents Susan Davies and Russell Savage contributed to the end of the Kennett era by agreeing to back Labor to form government after the 1999 election. Ingram was also returned in the 2002 and 2006 elections. He was defeated in 2010 by National candidate Tim Bull.

Members for Gippsland East

Election results

List of towns in Gippsland East 
Bairnsdale, Boisdale, Briagolong, Bruthen, Buchan, Cann River, Dargo, Ensay, Heyfield, Lakes Entrance, Lindenow, Maffra, Mallacoota, Metung, Newry, Omeo, Orbost, Paynesville, Raymond Island, Stratford, Swan Reach, Swifts Creek and Wy Yung.

References

External links
 Electorate profile: Gippsland East District, Victorian Electoral Commission

Gippsland East
Shire of East Gippsland
Gippsland East
Shire of Wellington